Aeronaut Glacier is a low gradient glacier extending  draining northeast from Gair Mesa into the upper part of Aviator Glacier near Navigator Nunatak, situated on the Borchgrevink Coast, named for Anglo-Norwegian explorer Carsten Borchgrevink (1864-1934) in the western extremity of Victoria Land, Antarctica. It was named by the northern party of New Zealand Geological Survey Antarctic Expedition of 1962–63 to commemorate the air support provided by U.S. Navy Squadron VX-6, and in association with nearby Aviator Glacier.

See also
 List of glaciers in the Antarctic

Glaciers of Borchgrevink Coast